Jewish outreach is a term sometimes used to translate the Hebrew word kiruv or keruv (literally, "to draw close" or "in-reach"). Normative Judaism forbids seeking converts to Judaism from other religions, although all denominations do accept those who follow through their conversion with a sincere commitment. Outreach efforts are instead directed at Jews who have "gone astray", or who have been born Jewish in a non-observant family.

Background and contemporary views
The idea of "Jewish outreach" has mixed support among Jews; some are against the concept, while others share a vision of a more accessible and inclusive Jewish community.

In the United States, a country with a mostly non-Orthodox or unaffiliated Jewish population and a 50% intermarriage rate, some Jewish federations and educational organizations provide an extensive range of offerings to the intermarried, to those who are marginally engaged with Jewish life, and to those who haven’t had any involvement in Judaism since attending Hebrew school or right after their bar mitzvah. "Chabad Lubavitch" was the first Orthodox Jewish organization in the United States to promote outreach means of recruiting  unobservant Jews who commit to living an observant lifestyle.

Rabbi Dr. Shmuly Yanklowitz wrote that "outreach should enrich lives and society by making the Torah’s wisdom more broadly available. Further, outreach is not only about “one’s own” and we must bring people of different religions together in mutual understanding and respect by engaging in deep interfaith dialogue.

Rabbi Levi Brackman said, "with the high rate of assimilation and intermarriage in the West, I cannot imagine that there could be too many outreach workers in the field. The day that happens will be a blessed one. The battle against assimilation is far too important for its warriors to get embroiled in politics of this sort. Undoubtedly, all the outreach organizations, Chabad included, should put their differences aside and pool together all their resources and ideas to create an even brighter Jewish tomorrow."

See also
 Anusim
 Crypto-Judaism
 Shavei Yisrael
 Zera Yisrael
 Association for Jewish Outreach Programs
 Baal teshuva movement
 Conversion to Judaism
 Jews for Judaism
 Outreach in Chabad Lubavitch
 Outreach in Conservative Judaism
 Outreach in Orthodox Judaism
 Outreach in Reform Judaism
 Musar movement
 Seven Laws of Noah
 Ger toshav (resident alien)
 Noahidism

Further reading

References

External links

Article about Jewish outreach at The Times of Israel
Outreach Judaism | Judaism's response to Christian missionaries
Big Tent Judaism - Embracing choices. Expanding communities. (Archived website)
 The New Face of Jewish Outreach - Jewish Action
InterfaithFamily's official website

 
Giving